Watom Island Rural LLG is a local-level government (LLG) of East New Britain Province, Papua New Guinea.

Wards
01. Rakival
02. Taranata
03. Valaur
04. Vunabuk
05. Vunakabai
06. Vunaulaiar

References

Local-level governments of East New Britain Province